The newsvendor (or newsboy or single-period or salvageable) model is a mathematical model in operations management and applied economics used to determine optimal inventory levels. It is (typically) characterized by fixed prices and uncertain demand for a perishable product. This model is also known as the newsvendor problem or newsboy problem by analogy with the situation faced by a newspaper vendor who must decide how many copies of the day's paper to stock in the face of uncertain demand and knowing that unsold copies will be worthless at the end of the day.

History 

The mathematical problem appears to date from 1888 where Edgeworth used the central limit theorem to determine the optimal cash reserves to satisfy random withdrawals from depositors.  
According to Chen, Cheng, Choi and Wang (2016), the term "newsboy" was first mentioned in an example of the Morse and Kimball (1951)'s book. The modern formulation relates to a paper in Econometrica by Kenneth Arrow, T. Harris, and Jacob Marshak.

More recent research on the classic newsvendor problem in particular focused on behavioral aspects: when trying to solve the problem in messy real-world contexts, to what extent do decision makers systematically vary from the optimum? Experimental and empirical research has shown that decision makers tend to be biased towards ordering too close to the expected demand (pull-to-center effect) and too close to the realisation from the previous period (demand chasing).

Overview

This model can also be applied to period review systems.

Assumptions
 Products are separable
 Planning is done for a single period
 Demand is random
 Deliveries are made in advance of demand
 Costs of overage or underage are linear

Profit function and the critical fractile formula 
The standard newsvendor profit function is

 

The solution to the optimal stocking quantity of the newsvendor which maximizes expected profit is:

Intuitively, this ratio, referred to as the critical fractile, balances the cost of being understocked (a lost sale worth ) and the total costs of being either overstocked or understocked (where the cost of being overstocked is the inventory cost, or  so total cost is simply ).

The critical fractile formula is known as Littlewood's rule in the yield management literature.

Numerical examples 
This gives a critical fractile of

Uniform distribution 

 

Therefore, the optimal inventory level is approximately 59 units.

Normal distribution 

Let demand, follow a normal distribution with a mean, demand of 50 and a standard deviation, of 20.

 

Therefore, optimal inventory level is approximately 39 units.

Lognormal distribution 

Let demand, follow a lognormal distribution with a mean demand of 50, and a standard deviation, of 0.2.

 

Therefore, optimal inventory level is approximately 45 units.

Extreme situation 
If  (i.e. the retail price is less than the purchase price), the numerator becomes negative. In this situation, it isn't worth keeping any items in the inventory.

Derivation of optimal inventory level

Critical fractile formula 

 

Now use

 

where .

 

So 

Take the derivative with respect to :

 

Now optimize: 

Technically, we should also check for convexity: 

Since  is monotone non-decreasing, this second derivative is always non-positive, so the critical point determined above is a global maximum.

Alternative formulation 

The problem above is cast as one of maximizing profit, although it can be cast slightly differently, with the same result. If the demand D exceeds the provided quantity q, then an opportunity cost of  represents lost revenue not realized because of a shortage of inventory. The derivation of this is as follows:

 

 

This is obviously the negative of the derivative arrived at above, and this is a minimization instead of a maximization formulation, so the critical point will be the same.

Cost based optimization of inventory level 
Assume that the 'newsvendor' is in fact a small company that wants to produce goods to an uncertain market. In this more general situation the cost function of the newsvendor (company) can be formulated in the following manner:

 

where the individual parameters are the following:
  – fixed cost. This cost always exists when the production of a series is started. [$/production]
  – variable cost. This cost type expresses the production cost of one product. [$/product]
  – the product quantity in the inventory. The decision of the inventory control policy concerns the product quantity in the inventory after the product decision. This parameter includes the initial inventory as well. If nothing is produced, then this quantity is equal to the initial quantity, i.e. concerning the existing inventory.
  – initial inventory level. We assume that the supplier possesses  products in the inventory at the beginning of the demand of the delivery period.
  – penalty cost (or back order cost). If there is less raw material in the inventory than needed to satisfy the demands, this is the penalty cost of the unsatisfied orders. [$/product]
  – a random variable with cumulative distribution function  representing uncertain customer demand. [unit]
  – expected value of random variable .
  – inventory and stock holding cost. [$ / product]

In , the first order loss function  captures the expected shortage quantity; its complement, denotes the expected product quantity in stock at the end of the period.

On the basis of this cost function the determination of the optimal inventory level is a minimization problem. So in the long run the amount of cost-optimal end-product can be calculated on the basis of the following relation:

See also 
 Infinite fill rate for the part being produced: Economic order quantity
 Constant fill rate for the part being produced: Economic production quantity
 Demand varies over time: Dynamic lot size model
 Several products produced on the same machine: Economic lot scheduling problem
 Reorder point
Inventory control system
Extended newsvendor model

References

Further reading 
 Ayhan, Hayriye, Dai, Jim, Foley, R. D., Wu, Joe, 2004: Newsvendor Notes, ISyE 3232 Stochastic Manufacturing & Service Systems. 
 Tsan-Ming Choi (Ed.)  Handbook of Newsvendor Problems: Models, Extensions and Applications, in Springer's International Series in Operations Research and Management Science, 2012.

Inventory optimization